Francesco Marrai (born 4 February 1993) is an Italian competitive sailor. He competed at the 2016 Summer Olympics in Rio de Janeiro, in the men's Laser class, finishing 12th.

References

External links

1993 births
Living people
Italian male sailors (sport)
Olympic sailors of Italy
Sailors at the 2016 Summer Olympics – Laser